The 44th annual Berlin International Film Festival was held from 10 to 21 February 1994. The Golden Bear was awarded to British-Irish film In the Name of the Father directed by Jim Sheridan. The retrospective dedicated to Austrian director, actor and producer Erich von Stroheim was shown at the festival.

Jury

The following people were announced as being on the jury for the festival:
 Jeremy Thomas, producer (United Kingdom) - Jury President
 Chinghiz Aitmatov, writer (Kyrgyzstan)
 María Luisa Bemberg, director and screenwriter (Argentina)
 Hsu Feng, actress and producer (Taiwan)
 Morgan Freeman, actor (United States)
 Francis Girod, actor, director and screenwriter (France)
 Corinna Harfouch, actress (Germany)
 Carlo Lizzani, director and screenwriter (Italy)
 Wolfram Schütte, writer and film critic (Germany)
 Susan Seidelman, director (United States)
 Hayao Shibata, producer (Japan)

Films in competition
The following films were in competition for the Golden Bear and Silver Bear awards:

Key
{| class="wikitable" width="550" colspan="1"
| style="background:#FFDEAD;" align="center"| †
|Winner of the main award for best film in its section
|}

Awards

The following prizes were awarded by the Jury:
 Golden Bear: In the Name of the Father by Jim Sheridan
 Silver Bear – Special Jury Prize: Fresa y chocolate by Tomás Gutiérrez Alea, Juan Carlos Tabío
 Silver Bear for Best Director: Krzysztof Kieślowski for Three Colors: White
 Silver Bear for Best Actress: Crissy Rock for Ladybird, Ladybird
 Silver Bear for Best Actor: Tom Hanks for Philadelphia
 Silver Bear for an outstanding single achievement: Smoking/No Smoking by Alain Resnais
 Silver Bear for an outstanding artistic contribution: God sobaki by Semyon Aranovich
 Alfred Bauer Prize: Hwa-Om-Kyung by Jang Sun-woo
 Honourable Mention:
 Sparkling Fox by Wu Ziniu
 Cari fottutissimi amici by Mario Monicelli
 Fearless by Peter Weir
 Blue Angel Award: Il giudice ragazzino by Alessandro Di Robilant
 Honorary Golden Bear: Sophia Loren

References

External links
44th Berlin International Film Festival 1994
1994 Berlin International Film Festival
Berlin International Film Festival:1994 at Internet Movie Database

44
1994 film festivals
1994 in Berlin
1994 in German cinema
1994 festivals in Europe